Aeolochroma languida is a moth of the family Geometridae first described by William Warren in 1898. It is found on New Guinea.

References

Moths described in 1898
Pseudoterpnini
Moths of New Guinea